Mount Vernon is a city in Westchester County, New York, United States. It is an inner suburb of New York City, immediately to the north of the borough of the Bronx. As of the 2020 census, Mount Vernon had a population of 73,893, making it the eighth most populous city in the state (2010).

Mount Vernon has two major sections. South-side Mount Vernon is more urban while north-side Mount Vernon is more residential. Mount Vernon's downtown business district is on the city's south side, which features the City Hall, Mount Vernon's main post office, Mount Vernon Public Library, office buildings, and other municipal establishments.

History

The Mount Vernon area was first settled in 1664 by families from Connecticut as part of the Town of Eastchester. Mount Vernon became a village in 1853, and a city in 1892. Mount Vernon takes its name from George Washington's Mount Vernon plantation in Virginia, much like neighboring Wakefield (in the Bronx) was named for the Virginia plantation where Washington was born (now part of George Washington Birthplace National Monument).

In 1894, the voters of Mount Vernon participated in a referendum on whether they wanted to consolidate into a new "City of Greater New York." The cities of Brooklyn (coterminous with Kings County) and Long Island City, the western towns and villages of Queens County, and all of Richmond County (present day Staten Island) all voted to join with the existing city (present day Manhattan and The Bronx). However, the returns were so negative in Mount Vernon and the adjacent city of Yonkers that those two areas were not included in the consolidated city and remain independent to this day.

The Mount Vernon Public Library, a gift to the city from Andrew Carnegie, opened in 1904 and is now part of the Westchester Library System, providing educational, cultural and computer services to county residents of all ages. The Mount Vernon Trust Company, opened in 1903. It was the largest bank in  Westchester County, with branches in the east and west sections of the city.

During the 1960s, Mount Vernon was a divided city on the brink of a "northern style" segregation. Many African Americans from the southern United States migrated north and settled in the city of Mount Vernon for better job opportunities and educational advancements. At the same time, many white Americans from the Bronx and Manhattan looked to Mount Vernon as a new "bedroom community" due to rising crime in New York City (a "white flight" factor contributed as well). As a result, Mount Vernon became divided in two by the New Haven Line railroad tracks of the Metro-North Railroad: North Side and South Side. The population south of the tracks became predominantly African American, while that north of the tracks was largely white.

At the height of this segregation in the 1970s, August Petrillo was mayor. When he died, Thomas E. Sharpe was elected mayor. Upon Sharpe's death in 1984, Carmella Iaboni took office as "acting mayor" until Ronald Blackwood was elected; Blackwood was the first Afro-Caribbean mayor of the city (as well as of any city in New York State). In 1996, Ernest D. Davis was elected the mayor of Mount Vernon; he served until 2007. Clinton I. Young, Jr. became the city's mayor on January 1, 2008. Four years later, on January 1, 2012, Ernest D. Davis became the 21st mayor of Mount Vernon. In 2013, Davis was investigated for failure to report rental income. In 2015, Richard Thomas ran against Davis (and several other opponents) and defeated him in an upset victory during the September primary. Thomas had to run again in the November general election, where he received 71% of the votes to become the Mayor of Mount Vernon.

In the subsequent 2019 election, Shawyn Patterson-Howard unseated the incumbent Mayor Thomas (as well as fellow candidates Clyde Isley and Councilman André Wallace, and others not on the final ballot including former Mayor Ernie Davis) in a hotly contested June primary to become the new Democratic nominee and went on to capture 81% of the vote to defeat André Wallace (who had since been named Acting Mayor and ran as a Republican) in the general election in November to become the first black woman elected mayor of Mount Vernon (and of any city in Westchester County).

Mount Vernon has in recent years undergone a transition from a city of homes and small businesses to a city of regional commerce. Between 2000 and 2006, the city of Mount Vernon's economy grew 20.5%, making it one of the fastest-growing cities in the New York metropolitan area.

January 2019 Loss of Moody's Rating

In January 2019, Moody withdrew its credit rating for Mount Vernon due to the City's failure to provide audited financial statements. According to local press accounts of the situation and internal city memos obtained from the Mount Vernon city website, the failure to prepare and deliver audited financial statements stems from a disagreement as to which entity would pay for the audit of  the Urban Renewal Agency (URA), one of the City's agencies, and which auditing firm would perform the audit. Further clouding the City's financial condition is the prospect that it might have a repayment obligation to HUD in connection with grants previously awarded to the City

2019 Mayoral dispute 
On July 9, 2019, mayor Richard Thomas pled guilty to stealing campaign funds and lying to the State Board of Elections. As part of the terms of the guilty plea, Thomas was ordered to resign from office by September 30, 2019. The city council moved to remove Thomas from office under the city charter's provision disqualifying felons from office, and appointed council president Andre Wallace as acting mayor. Thomas refused to resign from his post, citing the terms of the plea bargain. Wallace then appointed Shawn Harris as new police commissioner. After arriving for work, Thomas ordered the Mount Vernon Police to arrest Harris for trespassing. Harris was only released after an order from the Westchester County District Attorney. Both Thomas and Wallace occupied offices in the city hall, with Thomas in the mayor's office, under the guard of the Mount Vernon Police. Finally, before a packed courtroom in White Plains, Judge Ecker made a decisive ruling that Thomas had actually vacated the office of mayor on July 8, that Wallace had automatically assumed the office at that time, and that Wallace would be the acting mayor of Mount Vernon until January 1, 2020.

Mount Vernon Charter Revision Commission 
In March 2019, Mayor Richard Thomas called for the formation of the Mount Vernon Charter Revision Commission, suggesting the charter was antiquated, dating to the late 19th century.  In August 2019, the Commission presented its final report  which included four key proposed changes to the City's Charter:
 A new requirement for annual financial audits.
 Quarterly financial reports showing the city's fiscal condition.
 An updated comprehensive plan for economic growth.
 A periodic review of the city charter.

Notable sites 
St. Paul's Church is a Mount Vernon attraction designated as a National Historic Site.

Mount Vernon sites included on the National Register of Historic Places include:
First United Methodist Church
John Stevens House
Trinity Episcopal Church Complex
United States Post Office on First Street
Former Con Edison Westchester County HQ, which is now Westchester County Social Services (Mount Vernon)

Geography

Location
Mount Vernon is at  (40.914060, -73.830507). It is the third-largest and the most densely populated city in Westchester County.

Mount Vernon is bordered by the village of Bronxville and city of New Rochelle to the north, by the town of Pelham and village of Pelham Manor to the east, by the Hutchinson River and the Eastchester and Wakefield sections of the Bronx to the south, and by the city of Yonkers and the Bronx River to the west.

Elevation
The city's seal, created in 1892, depicts what were then considered the highest points in Mount Vernon: Trinity Place near Fourth Street, Vista Place at Barnes Avenue, and North 10th Street between Washington and Jefferson places. Since then, it was discovered that the city's highest elevation is on New York Route 22, North Columbus Avenue, at the Bronxville line.

Neighborhoods

Mount Vernon is typically divided into four major sections in four square miles: Downtown, Mount Vernon Heights, North Side, and South Side.

Downtown
Downtown Mount Vernon features the Gramatan Avenue and Fourth Avenue shopping district (known as "The Avenue" by locals) and the Petrillo Plaza transit hub, and houses the city's central government.

Downtown is in the same condition it was 40 years ago. It features the same mid-century architecture and format. Former mayor Clinton Young vowed to make Mount Vernon a new epicenter with a new central business district. His failed plans included establishing commercial office space and rezoning to allow high density development in the downtown, as well as affordable and market rate housing.

Mount Vernon Heights
Mount Vernon Heights' highly elevated terrain has earned the moniker "the rolling hills of homes". It is home to the city's commercial corridor, along Sandford Boulevard (6th Street).

Sandford Blvd (6th Street)—also known as "Sandford Square"—is a certified commercial corridor, which anchors businesses such as Bed Bath & Beyond, Best Buy, Colonial Plaza (a strip mall), CVS Pharmacy, Famous Footwear, Petco, Restaurant Depot, Staples, Stop and Shop, and Target. Sandford Square attracts residents from Mount Vernon, nearby communities in Westchester County and the Bronx, and shoppers from as far away as Connecticut via the Merritt Parkway and I-95, which merge onto the Hutchinson River Parkway.

Most of the commercial development in this corridor has occurred since the 1980s. The area is still undergoing revitalization to encourage economic development within this  of land along and around the boulevard.

North Side
Mount Vernon's North Side is one of the most ethnically diverse neighborhoods in Westchester County. The northern part of the city consists of five neighborhoods: Chester Heights, Estate Manor/Aubyn Estates, Fleetwood, Huntswood, and Oakwood Heights. In Fleetwood, many large co-op buildings line the center of town, which is bisected by Gramatan Avenue.

South Side

Mount Vernon's South Side, which abuts The Bronx, resembles New York City and includes the neighborhoods Parkside, South Side and Vernon Park. Numerous industrial businesses are in Parkside, while the rest of South Side Mount Vernon features multi-family homes, apartment buildings, and commercial businesses.

South Side Mount Vernon features notable city landmarks such as Brush Park, Hutchinson Field, the Boys and Girls Club, and St. Paul's Church National Historic Site.

Demographics

2020 census

2010 census data
As of the 2010 United States Census, there were 67,292 people living in the city. The racial makeup of the city was 61.3% Black, 18.5% White, 0.3% Native American, 1.8% Asian, <0.1% Pacific Islander, 1.4% from some other race and 2.5% from two or more races. 14.3% were Hispanic or Latino of any race.

2000 census data
As of the 2000 census, 68,381 people, 27,048 households, and 18,432 families resided in the city. The population density was 14,290.3 people per square mile (5,792.7/km2), with 28,558 housing units at an average density of 7,205.9 per square mile (3,509.3/km2). The racial makeup of the city was 59.58% African American, 28.63% White, 10.48% Hispanic or Latino of any race, 4.85% from other races, 4.44% from two or more races, 2.12% Asian, 0.05% Pacific Islander, and 0.32% Native American. A significant proportion of the population is of Brazilian descent; Brazilians can be included in the African American, White, Multiracial and/or Latino categories. Similarly, a significant part of the Black and/or Latino population is of Caribbean origin.

There were 27,048 households, of which 40.9% were married couples living together, 31.1% had children under the age of 18 living with them, 37.2% were non-families, and 28.0% had a female householder with no husband present. 30.0% of all households were made up of individuals, and 10.7% had someone living alone who was 65 years of age or older. The average household size was 2.63 and the average family size was 3.27.

In the city, the population was spread out, with 25.3% under the age of 18, 8.3% from 18 to 24, 31.1% from 25 to 44, 22.4% from 45 to 64, and 12.9% who were 65 years of age or older. The median age was 36 years.

For every 100 females, there were 82.3 males. For every 100 females age 18 and over, there were 76.9 males.

The median income for a household in the city was $47,128, and the median income for a family was $55,573. Males had a median income of $41,493 versus $37,871 for females. The per capita income for the city was $24,827. 13.9% of the population and 11.8% of families were below the poverty line. 12.7% of the population was 65 or older.

Economy
Mount Vernon's three major employers are the Mount Vernon city school district with (1,021 employees), Michael Anthony Jewelers (712 employees), and Mount Vernon Hospital (700 employees).

Mount Vernon has a large commercial sector, with industries such as electronics, engineering, high tech, historical metal restoration, and manufacturing mainly in the Southside section of the city.

Mount Vernon also has an established Empire Zone for commercial and industrial use, in the southern portion of the city.

Parks and recreation

The city limits contain a number of city parks large and small , and Willson's Woods Park, a  county-owned park. One of the oldest parks in the county system, Willson's Woods offers a wave pool, water slides, and a spray deck and water playground, against the backdrop of an English Tudor style bathhouse. The park also has areas for picnicking and fishing.[This reference moved from previous location and citation needed template moved to unsourced statement above]

Government

The City of Mount Vernon is governed by a five-member city council, a mayor, and a comptroller. As per the city charter, to balance power, the mayor runs every four years with two council members, and the comptroller runs two years after the mayor with three council members. Therefore, in 2019, the mayor and two council seats were up for re-election; in 2021 the remaining offices will be up for election. Beyond the regular political powers of elected officials, the City of Mount Vernon also has a checks and balances voting session called the Board of Estimate.

City Council
The city council consists of five representatives, elected at-large, one of whom is the city council president. The city council president is appointed/elected by the existing city council members. Under normal circumstances the council presidency is rotated, as are the council committee assignments as chair of the four council committees. In recent years, the full rotation has ceased to reappoint the more experienced council members. The council president also serves as mayor, in the absence of the mayor. This can occur when the mayor is out of town, had resigned, or dies in office. When this happens the president pro tempore becomes acting city council president and the acting president pro tempore becomes assumes his/her duties.

Mayor

Comptroller

Board of Estimate
The Board of Estimate is composed of the mayor, the city council president, and the comptroller. The city council president votes of behalf of the city council. All monetary decisions, including the annual budget and many legal ramifications, must pass vote of the Board of Estimate, which meets every Tuesday after the city council's Wednesday legislative session.

Court system

The Mount Vernon city court is part of the New York State Unified Court System. It has three elected full-time judges who serve for ten years and one part-time associate judge who is appointed by the mayor for a period of eight years. The judges of the court are William Edwards, Adrian Armstrong, and Nichelle Johnson. Adam Seiden serves as an associate judge of the court. The court handles a wide variety of cases, including initial processing of all felony criminal cases; handling of all misdemeanor cases from inception through trial; civil proceedings with a limited monetary jurisdiction of up to $15,000; all landlord tenant cases originating in the city; small claims cases; and all vehicle and traffic law matters. The court is housed in the public safety complex, which is adjacent to City Hall.

Education

Mount Vernon City School District consist of 11 elementary schools, two middle schools, two high schools and one alternative high school.

Westchester Community College has an extension site education facility, downtown.

In 2011, The Journal News featured an article titled "Region's Aging Schools Crumble as Finances Falter", by Cathey O'Donnell and Gary Stern. The article discussed several old school buildings within the region that were in disrepair, how much it would cost to fix them, and which if any might need to be demolished. The Mount Vernon school district was included in the article, which stated:

"In Mount Vernon, meanwhile, where a high school wall collapsed last year, inspectors flagged buildings for insufficient smoke detectors, poor air quality, evidence of rodents and vermin, halls without emergency lighting and junction boxes with exposed live wires."

Infrastructure and services

Fire department
The city of Mount Vernon is protected by the Mount Vernon Fire Department (FDMV). The FDMV currently operates out of four firehouses, throughout the city, under the command of a Deputy Chief each shift. The department operates four engine companies, two ladder companies, and one rescue company. The department responds to approximately 8,000 emergency calls annually.

Police department 
As of 2021, the Mount Vernon Police Department has 184 officers.

In May 2021, the District Attorney for Westchester County requested intervention by the Department of Justice (DOJ) for civil rights violations by the Mount Vernon Police Department. The DOJ announced its civil investigation in December 2021.

Healthcare
The 115-year-old Mount Vernon Hospital has 121 beds. It is part of the Montefiore Health System and provides in-patient, critical care, and ambulatory services to residents of Mount Vernon and neighboring communities. The hospital is most known for its premier Chronic Wound Treatment and Hyperbaric Center, which is one of the most advanced in the Northeast. It also offers a variety of services, including the Assertive Community Treatment Center (ACT), the Family Health and Wellness Center, the Hopfer School of Nursing, Hyperbaric Medicine, and Intensive Case Management.

Mount Vernon Hospital is one of four hospitals in the county that provides programs in medicine, nursing, podiatry, and surgery. (Montefiore New Rochelle Hospital, Westchester Medical Center, and White Plains Hospital are the others.)

The expansion plans include 15 private treatment rooms and upgrades to the waiting area, triage room and other areas in the emergency department.

The area around the hospital has many medical office buildings and treatment facilities which provide healthcare to residents living in Mount Vernon, the southeast section of Yonkers, and the north Bronx, which shares a border with the city. For example, Planned Parenthood Hudson Peconic, the Planned Parenthood affiliate that serves New York's Putnam, Rockland, Suffolk and Westchester Counties, opened its first medical center in Mount Vernon in 1935; the affiliate remains a vital source for reproductive health care services to Mount Vernon residents.

Places of worship
The city's previous motto was "A City That Believes". This is reflected in the houses of worship in the city that represent more than 25 denominations.

Research has confirmed the tradition that Grace Baptist Church was founded in 1888 by a few women who formally had been enslaved and it discovered their names: Emily Waller, Matilda Brooks, Helen Claiborne, Sahar Bennett, and Elizabeth Benson.

Transportation

In late 2005, the RBA Group conducted a study and found that over 5,000 commuters traverse the area on a daily basis; about 3,600 commuters use the Westchester County Bee-Line Bus System, and 1,500 use the Metropolitan Transportation Authority's Metro-North Railroad commuter rail service.
 Petrillo Plaza, adjacent to Metro North's Mount Vernon East station in downtown Mount Vernon, is the hub for Westchester's Bee-Line Bus System service in Mount Vernon. The Mount Vernon's taxi services operate from Petrillo Plaza as well.
 Bee-Line Bus routes serving Mount Vernon are 7, 40, 41, 42, 43, 52, 53, 54, 55, as well as the 91, which operates during the summer.
 A New York City Bus route (MTA) serves two blocks in Mount Vernon along the NYC border. The  travels along Mundy Lane (S. 11th Avenue) between W. 5th Street (Nereid Avenue) and W. Sandford Blvd (Pittman Avenue).
 The Metro-North's north–south Harlem Line stops at Mount Vernon West and Fleetwood, both on the western edge of Mount Vernon; the west–east New Haven Line stops at Mount Vernon East, in the heart of downtown.
The  terminates at 241st Street in Wakefield. The  terminates at Dyre Avenue in Eastchester. Additionally, the  goes to Nereid Avenue during rush hours in the peak direction. Both locations are within 5 minutes walking distance of Southside Mount Vernon.

Notable people

 A.D.O.R.
 Camille Akeju
 Lou Albano
 Bob Baldwin
 Alessandra Biaggi 
 John Branca
 Ralph Branca
 Jonathan Briley
 Art Carney
 Jonathan Stuart Cerullo
 Susie Essman
 David Chase
 Dick Clark
 Sean Combs
 Isaiah Cousins 
 Andre Drummond
 DJ Eddie F
 Damion Easley
 Linda Fairstein
 Adelaide Gescheidt
 Robin Givens
 Seth Godin
 Ben Gordon
 Paul Grassi
 Rudy Hackett
 Mark Harris
 Christine E. Haycock
 Heavy D
 W.C. Heinz
 Michael Imperioli
 Kay Johnson
 Kevin Jones
 Andy Karl
 Roz Kelly
 Harvey Kurtzman
 Benton MacKaye
 Johnny Marks
 Frances Marlatt
 Danny Mastrogiorgio
 Rodney McCray
 Scooter McCray
 The Mello-Kings (vocal group)
 Stephanie Mills
 Lowes Moore
 Robin Morgan
 Robert Mosbacher
 Sal Mosca
 Asia Nitollano
 Michael O'Keefe
 Floyd Patterson
 Sidney Poitier
 Adam Clayton Powell
 Phylicia Rashad
 Leon Robinson
 Pete Rock
 Larry Romano 
 Wayne Allyn Root
James Rowson
 Davetta Sherwood
 John Simon
 Nina Simone
 Ken Singleton
 Roy Smith
 J. B. Smoove
 Lionel Stander
 John M. Sternhagen
 Al B. Sure!
 Earl Tatum
 Denzel Washington
 Barbara Werle
 E. B. White
 Gus Williams
 Ray Williams
 Sylvia Woods
 DMX

In popular culture

Motion pictures

Advertising
Memorial Field in Mount Vernon was used to film the classic "Mean Joe Greene" Coca-Cola commercial in May 1979.

Films
Multiple movies have been set in or featured Mount Vernon, such as:

Dead Presidents (1995)
 Empty Places (1999)
 The Thomas Crown Affair (1999): shot a scene in Willson's Woods Park, which was transformed to look like Central Park; the Vernon Woods co-op complex was used to stage and store equipment during the scene.
 Riding in Cars with Boys (2001)
 Eternal Sunshine of the Spotless Mind (2004)
 The Book of Henry (2017): the ending scene with the main characters walking out of the courthouse. It is unclear if the entire story took place in Mount Vernon or not.

Television

Scenes from multiple TV shows have been shot in Mount Vernon, such as:
 Sneaky Pete (Amazon series)
The Leftovers
 The Suburbs (web series) (2008–present)

See also

References

External links

 City of Mount Vernon official website at cmvny.com

 
1664 establishments in the Province of New York
Cities in New York (state)
Cities in the New York metropolitan area
Cities in Westchester County, New York
Populated places established in 1664
Populated places established in 1850